Camptopoeum is a genus of bees of the subfamily Panurginae.

Species 
Catalogue of Life lists 31 species and 15 subspecies within Camptopoeum:

 Camptopoeum abbasi (Warncke, 1985) 
 Camptopoeum afghanicum Patiny, 1999
 Camptopoeum altaicum Morawitz, 1891
 Camptopoeum armeniacum (Warncke, 1972) 
 Camptopoeum bactrianum Popov, 1960
 Camptopoeum baldocki Wood & Cross, 2017
 Camptopoeum clypeare Morawitz, 1893
 Camptopoeum friesei Mocsáry, 1894
 Camptopoeum friesei densum (Warncke, 1972) 
 Camptopoeum friesei euzonum (Warncke, 1972) 
 Camptopoeum friesei friesei Morawitz, 1894
 Camptopoeum frontale (Fabricius, 1804) 
 Camptopoeum frontale frontale (Fabricius, 1804) 
 Camptopoeum frontale persicum Cockerell, 1910
 Camptopoeum frontale triticum (Warncke, 1972) 
 Camptopoeum guichardi Patiny, 1999
 Camptopoeum handlirschi Friese, 1900
 Camptopoeum handlirschi handlirschi Friese, 1900
 Camptopoeum handlirschi verhoeffi Noskiewicz, 1962
 Camptopoeum iranellum (Warncke, 1985) 
 Camptopoeum khuzestanum (Warncke, 1985) 
 Camptopoeum kuznetzovi (Cockerell, 1929) 
 Camptopoeum longicephalum (Warncke, 1987) 
 Camptopoeum mirabile Morawitz, 1875
 Camptopoeum nadigi (Warncke, 1972) 
 Camptopoeum nasutum (Spinola, 1838) 
 Camptopoeum negevense (Warncke, 1972) 
 Camptopoeum nigrotum (Warncke, 1987) 
 Camptopoeum pictipes (Morawitz, 1876) 
 Camptopoeum pseudorubrum (Warncke, 1987) 
 Camptopoeum rubrum (Warncke, 1987) 
 Camptopoeum rufiventre Morawitz, 1880
 Camptopoeum sacrum Alfken, 1935
 Camptopoeum samarkandum (Radoszkowski, 1871) 
 Camptopoeum schewyrewi Morawitz, 1897
 Camptopoeum simile (Pérez, 1895) 
 Camptopoeum simile scutellare (Pérez, 1895) 
 Camptopoeum simile simile (Pérez, 1895) 
 Camptopoeum subflavum (Warncke, 1987) 
 Camptopoeum variegatum (Morawitz, 1876) 
 Camptopoeum variegatum berberum (Warncke, 1972) 
 Camptopoeum variegatum graecum (Warncke, 1972) 
 Camptopoeum variegatum israelense (Warncke, 1972) 
 Camptopoeum variegatum kilikae (Warncke, 1972) 
 Camptopoeum variegatum variegatum (Morawitz, 1876) 
 Camptopoeum warnckei Patiny, 1999

References 

Andrenidae